Nature's Best is a two-disc compilation album of thirty New Zealand popular music songs, selected by a panel as the top thirty New Zealand songs of all time.

Selection

The genesis of the idea was the 75th anniversary of the Australasian Performing Right Association  (APRA) in New Zealand in 2001 and the selection of the top 100 New Zealand songs of the past 75 years. A list of over 900 candidate songs was prepared, and voting was open to APRA members and an invited academy. The list of the top 100 songs was announced in stages in 2001, with the number one place going to the 1969 song "Nature" by Fourmyula.

A collaborative effort by representatives of major record companies and APRA - most notably Mike Chunn - took place to produce an album of the top 30 songs from this selection. The resulting album was named Nature's Best after the title song, and was released in January 2002 on the Sony Music label. Sales were extraordinary - in the first four months after its release, over 100,000 copies were sold (over quintuple platinum in the New Zealand market).

Follow-ups
Subsequent releases followed: 
 Nature's Best 2 and Nature's Best 3, 2002, songs 31-65 and 66-100 of the official APRA list
 DVD release, 2003, music videos to sixty of the songs from the three albums
 Limited edition box set of the three albums and the DVD, 2005 (Nature's Best Box Set)
 More Nature, 2006, a selection of notable New Zealand songs since 2001

Track listing

Disc one
"Nature" - Fourmyula (Wayne Mason, 1969)
"Don't Dream It's Over" - Crowded House (Neil Finn, 1986)
"Loyal" - Dave Dobbyn (Dave Dobbyn, 1988)
"Counting the Beat" - The Swingers (Phil Judd/Mark Hough/Wayne Stevens, 1981)
"Six Months in a Leaky Boat" - Split Enz (Tim Finn, 1982)
"Sway" - Bic Runga (Bic Runga, 1997)
"Slice of Heaven" - Dave Dobbyn with Herbs (Dave Dobbyn, 1986)
"Victoria" - Dance Exponents (Jordan Luck, 1982)
"She Speeds" - Straitjacket Fits (Shayne Carter/Fits, 1987)
"April Sun in Cuba" - Dragon (Paul Hewson/Marc Hunter, 1978)
"I Got You" - Split Enz (Neil Finn, 1980)
"Whaling" - DD Smash (Dave Dobbyn, 1984)
"Not Given Lightly" - Chris Knox (Chris Knox, 1990)
"Pink Frost" - The Chills (Martin Phillipps, 1984)
"Jesus I Was Evil" - Darcy Clay (Darcy Clay, 1997)

Disc two
"Weather with You" - Crowded House (Tim Finn/Neil Finn, 1991)
"Blue Smoke" - Pixie Williams & The Ruru Karaitiana Quartet (Ruru Karaitiana, 1949)
"Dance All Around the World" - Blerta (Corben Simpson/Geoff Murphy, 1972)
"Lydia" - Fur Patrol (Julia Deans, 2000)
"Blue Lady" - Hello Sailor (Graham Brazier, 1977)
"Drive" - Bic Runga (Bic Runga, 1996)
"Chains" - DLT featuring Che Fu (Che Ness/Darryl Thompson/Angus McNaughton/Kevin Rangihuna, 1996)
"Dominion Road" - The Mutton Birds (Don McGlashan, 1992)
"(Glad I'm) Not a Kennedy" - Shona Laing (Shona Laing, 1986)
"I Hope I Never" - Split Enz (Tim Finn, 1980)
"Tears" - The Crocodiles (Fane Flaws/Arthur Baysting, 1980)
"Be Mine Tonight" - Th' Dudes (Dave Dobbyn/Ian Morris, 1978)
"I See Red" - Split Enz (Tim Finn, 1979)
"Beside You" - Dave Dobbyn (Dave Dobbyn, 1998)
"Home Again" - Shihad (Karl Kippenberger/Tom Larkin/Phil Knight/Jon Toogood, 1997)

See also
APRA Top 100 New Zealand Songs of All Time
 Nature's Best 2
 Nature's Best 3
 More Nature
 Nature's Best DVD
 Australasian Performing Right Association
 Music of New Zealand
 New Zealand rock
 Mike Chunn

References

External links
 The National Anthems, New Zealand Herald, November 3, 2001

 
2002 compilation albums
Sony Music New Zealand compilation albums